Limpsfield is a village and civil parish in Surrey, England, at the foot of the North Downs close to Oxted railway station and the A25. The composer Frederick Delius and orchestral conductor Sir Thomas Beecham are buried in the village churchyard and there are 89 listed buildings.

History

The village lay within the Anglo-Saxon Tandridge hundred.

Limpsfield appears in the Domesday Book of 1086 as Limenesfeld. It was held by the Abbot of Battle Abbey, Sussex. Its Domesday assets were: 1 church, 1 mill worth 2s, 19 ploughs, 1 fishery,  of meadow, woodland worth 150 hogs, 2 stone quarries, and 3 nests of hawks. It rendered £24 (of silver) per year to its feudal overlords.

Old Court Cottage in Titsey Road, formerly the manorial court of the Abbot of Battle, is grade I listed building and dates from c.1190-1200 (including aisle posts and arcade plates) with alterations in the late 14th century, and a 16th-century crosswing. Reginald Mason cited this in 1964 as an outstandingly important early example of a timber-framed building in the south of England.

The parish church of Saint Peter was constructed in the late 12th century and is a grade I listed building, extensively restored in the 19th century. The tower, with two-light plate-tracery windows of c.1260, is made of ironstone rubble with stone dressings and dressed stone to north aisle. In addition it has a wooden-shingled spire with a wooden cross surmounted. St Peter's church is also home to the last stained glass windows produced by John David Hayward, who lived for many years in nearby Edenbridge; the window depicts Saint Cecilia. Hayward was a leading artist in stained glass in the 20th century.

There are approximately twenty medieval buildings within the parish, and there are 89 listed buildings.

Landmarks
The village heart is in a conservation area and some of the surrounding area is National Trust land including Limpsfield Common. Staffhurst Wood is also within the parish boundaries and is notable for its bluebells in spring. Limpsfield Chart has a golf course and cricket club. Limpsfield itself has a football team and a tennis club and its current cricket club is a united team with Oxted, named Oxted & Limpsfield Cricket Club with two grounds.

The village is served by Oxted railway station.

Geography

The civil and ecclesiastical parish area is grouped to the north and south of Hurst Green, Surrey.  The built up section is north of Hurst Green and both east and north-east of Oxted.  The lowest elevation is 62m at Staffhurst Wood on the south-western parish boundary on the River Eden, Kent and highest is just east of the town centre at Grubstreet Copse at 163m; (Titsey being a separate civil parish north of the village and higher on the North Downs).

The M25 motorway is to the north and Junction 6 for Godstone is just  miles west.

Nearby are three national rights of way: Vanguard Way, Pilgrims' Way and Greensand Way, the latter two along the hill ranges the North Downs and the Greensand Ridge.

Localities

Limpsfield Chart

Limpsfield Chart, arguably a village in its own right, begins from the south side of the A25. Chart is an Old English word for rough ground.

The adjacent High Chart, south-east of Limpsfield, is a large area of woodland, owned by the National Trust, which has a network of footpaths. The remains of a Roman road, the London to Lewes Way, pass through the woods east of the village, where it makes an eastward diversion from its alignment to avoid steep slopes. It passes through Crockham Hill before returning to its line near Marlpit Hill.

In the village is the C of E church of St Andrew, which it is the place of worship of 'a Conventional District' in the ecclesiastical parish of Limpsfield and Titsey, built in 1895. There is a pub The Carpenters Arms in the centre.

Within it is the halfway point in the Greensand Way long distance footpath which runs for 110 miles from Haslemere in Surrey to Hamstreet in Kent along the Greensand Ridge.

Governance
Sam Gyimah was the Member of Parliament for East Surrey, which includes Limpsfield from 2010-2019. He joined the Liberal Democrats in 2019 having left the Conservatives. He stood down at the last General Election and was replaced by Conservative Claire Coutinho.

There is one representative on Surrey County Council representing Limpsfield as part of the Oxted division. Cameron McIntosh is the local Councillor and is a member of the Conservative group. 

There are two representatives on Tandridge District Council for Limpsfield.

There is also a parish council with ten members.

Demography and housing

The average level of accommodation in the region composed of detached houses was 28%, the average that was apartments was 22.6%.

The proportion of households in the civil parish who owned their home outright compares to the regional average of 35.1%.  The proportion who owned their home with a loan compares to the regional average of 32.5%.  The remaining % is made up of rented dwellings (plus a negligible % of households living rent-free).

Nearest settlements

Notable residents
The composer Frederick Delius is buried in the churchyard of the parish church of St. Peter's, as is his wife Jelka. The English orchestra conductor, Sir Thomas Beecham, is buried only a few yards from Delius, whose music he supported and promoted. A nearby grave is occupied by the cellist Beatrice Harrison, who lived locally in Oxted, and who worked with both Delius and Beecham. The ashes of Jack Brymer (1915 - 2003), a leading English clarinettist are interred in the churchyard near the grave of Beecham, who had recruited him to the RPO.
 
The Scottish statesman and historian, Mountstuart Elphinstone, associated with the government of British India, is buried in Limpsfield churchyard.

Rear Admiral Robert Gambier Middleton (1774-1837) who was active in the Napoleonic Wars and was Storekeeper-General of the Navy from 1829 to 1832 is buried in Limpsfield Churchyard.

The German naval officer, maritime and naval writer, and committed Nazi Fritz-Otto Busch is buried in a corner of Limpsfield Churchyard.

Leonard Montague Greenwood MC (bar),DSO (1893-1918) who is buried in Rouen is commemorated on his parents' gravestone in Limpsfield Churchyard.

Glyn Ashfield DFC who fought in the Battle of Britain and died in 1942 when his Mosquito aircraft crashed on a low flying exercise
 is buried in Limpsfield Churchyard.

Sergeant Pilot John Ferguson RAFVR who died in 1942 when his Wellington Bomber crashed while on a night cross-country training flight 
 is buried in Limpsfield Churchyard.

Brigadier Cecil Haigh, who was  a Deputy Director of Ordnance Services in various roles during the Second World War is buried in Limpsfield Churchyard.

Henry Alan Ede OBE who was Senior Inspector of Taxes in Birmingham in 1944 is buried in Limpsfield Churchyard.

Sir George Paish the economist, is buried in Limpsfield Churchyard.

Maurice Hankey, 1st Baron Hankey of the Chart is buried in Limpsfield Churchyard.

Cyril Jackson (educationist) is buried in Limpsfield Churchyard.

Sir John Arthur Thomson FRSE LLD the Scottish naturalist who was an expert on soft corals is buried in Limpsfield Churchyard.

Sophia Amelia Dent who was the widow of T.W.J. Dent of Flass in Westmoreland is buried in the churchyard. Her husband’s uncles Thomas, Lancelot and Wilkinson Dent were for some time British merchants based in Canton, China dealing primarily in opium. 

Marmaduke Hilton, who is buried in Limpsfield Church was a "a West India merchant" and mortgagee of two slave-owning estates in Jamaica.

Colin Cowdrey, former England cricket captain, resided in the village for many years.

Arthur Rackham, the book illustrator, lived and died in Pains Hill (a small hamlet to the south of Limpsfield village).

Davina McCall, the television host, spent much of her childhood in Limpsfield.

Florence L. Barclay, the romance novelist and short story writer, was the daughter of the local Anglican rector.

David Garnett, the novelist and Bloomsbury figure, spent his childhood in a house called The Cearne on the outskirts of the village. His mother Constance Garnett was a translator of Russian literature.

The composer Pamela Harrison and her conductor husband Harvey Phillips lived at The Cearne from the late 1940s and into the 1950s. 

Jeremy Thorpe, politician, lived in Limpsfield for part of his childhood, and attended Hazelwood School.

See also
List of places of worship in Tandridge (district)

References

External links

 Limpsfield parish council
 Limpsfield from Victoria County History

Villages in Surrey
Civil parishes in Surrey
Oxted